Sarah Pulliam Bailey is an American journalist who serves as a religion reporter for The Washington Post.

Biography
Bailey is the great-granddaughter of Eugene C. Pulliam and the granddaughter of Eugene S. Pulliam.

She earned a degree in communication from Wheaton College, where she served as editor-in-chief of the Wheaton Record campus newspaper.

From 2008 to 2012 she was an online editor for Christianity Today, in which role she interviewed such prominent figures as Barack Obama and Billy Graham. Her work received three awards from the Evangelical Press Association and was nominated for various awards from the Religion Newswriters Association.

In June 2013, she became a national correspondent at Religion News Service. One of her first interviews in that position was with Desmond Tutu. In 2014, she was the first to break the news that Mark Driscoll had resigned from the church he founded.

References

External links
 Personal website
 articles at The Washington Post
 articles at Religion News Service

Living people
American women journalists
21st-century American women writers
American Christian writers
Pulliam family
Year of birth missing (living people)
Wheaton College (Illinois) alumni
The Washington Post journalists